Tall Poppies Records is an Australian record label founded in September 1991 by Belinda Webster. It focuses on recording solo and chamber music in the classical genre. It is particularly dedicated to promoting the work of Australian composers.

The name of the label derives from the "tall poppy syndrome", because those involved feel that, in Australia, there is a tendency to criticise or downplay those who achieve success.

Musician list

Composers
Peter Sculthorpe
Ross Edwards
Nigel Westlake
Georges Lentz
Carl Vine
David Stanhope
Andrew Ford
Andrew Schultz
Anne Boyd
Nigel Butterley
Tristram Cary
Elena Kats-Chernin
Anne Ghandar
Graeme Koehne
Rik Rue
Martin Wesley-Smith
Bruce Cale

Performers
Australia Ensemble
Song Company
Australian Youth Orchestra
David Pereira
Ian Munro
Merlyn Quaife
Lisa Moore
Michael Kieran Harvey
Stephanie McCallum
David Stanhope
Geoffrey Lancaster
Timothy Kain
Riley Lee
Roy Howat
David Bollard
Sydney Chamber Choir
Goldner String Quartet

See also

List of record labels

References

External links
Tall Poppies website

Australian record labels
Australian independent record labels
Record labels established in 1991
1991 establishments in Australia